Lounès Gaouaoui (born September 28, 1977) is an Algerian former footballer who played as a goalkeeper and the current goalkeeping coach of USM Alger.

Playing career
Gaouaoui was a member of the Algerian national team that lost in the quarter-finals at the 2004 African Cup of Nations. He was until recently Algeria's first-choice goalkeeper and had played in all of his country's main qualifiers for the 2010 FIFA World Cup, but suspension and an attack of appendicitis forced him respectively to miss his country's World Cup qualification playoff against Egypt and the 2010 African Cup of Nations which both saw Faouzi Chaouchi replace him. This lengthy period of inactivity eventually cost him his spot as first-choice goalkeeper for the World Cup Finals, despite being named in the final squad.

Coaching career
Gaouaoui started his coaching career with CS Constantine as a playing assistant manager. In December 2013, he took over the club as a caretaker manager. He was in charge for two games, before being replaced in the beginning of January 2014 and then continued at the club as a playing assistant manager.

In October 2015, he returned to JS Kabylie as a goalkeeper coach. He left the club in March 2018 and was hired by the national team of Algeria as a goalkeeper coach.

In October 2019, he was hired as a goalkeeper coach for CA Bordj Bou Arréridj.

Career statistics

Club

International

Honours
Won the Algerian league twice in 2004 and 2006 with JS Kabylie
Runner up in the Algerian league twice in 2002 and 2005 with JS Kabylie
Finalist of the Algerian Cup in 2004 with JS Kabylie
Won the CAF Cup three times in 2000, 2001 and 2002 with JS Kabylie
His name is believed to be the only surname with seven vowels in a row, reported by the International Board of Statistics.

References

External links
 

1977 births
Living people
Footballers from Tizi Ouzou
Kabyle people
Algerian footballers
Algeria international footballers
JS Kabylie players
WA Tlemcen players
2010 FIFA World Cup players
ASO Chlef players
USM Annaba players
USM Blida players
CS Constantine players
Algerian Ligue Professionnelle 1 players
2002 African Cup of Nations players
2004 African Cup of Nations players
Association football goalkeepers
21st-century Algerian people